"Pretty Brown Eyes" is a song by Australian singer Cody Simpson. It is the lead single from his second studio album, Surfers Paradise (July 2013). It was released ahead of the album on 23 April, as a digital download in Australia. The song reached the top 100 on the Canadian, Irish and United Kingdom's singles charts. It was co-written by Simpson with songwriting duo, Timothy and Theron Thomas (brothers from Planet VI or Rock City) and Vasquez Castillo.

Music video

A music video to accompany the release of "Pretty Brown Eyes" was first released onto YouTube on 22 April 2013, however the link was deleted or moved to private section, since August 2014.

Track listing

Charts and certifications

Weekly charts

Certifications

Release history

References

2012 songs
2013 singles
Cody Simpson songs
Atlantic Records singles
Songs written by Timothy Thomas
Songs written by Theron Thomas
Songs written by Cody Simpson